Dariush Yazdi (Persian: داریوش یزدی, born 11 September 1970 in Masjed Soleyman, Khuzestan Province) is an Iranian retired football player and manager who recently managed Esteghlal Khuzestan in the Persian Gulf Pro League.

References

External links
 Esteghlal players

Living people
1970 births
Iranian footballers
Esteghlal F.C. players
Association football defenders
People from Masjed Soleyman
Iranian football managers
Esteghlal Khuzestan F.C.
Sportspeople from Khuzestan province